Mount Signal is a mountain  west of Mexicali, Baja California, Mexico, on Mexican Federal Highway 2. The peak is also known as "Weeishpa" by the native community Kumiai or "Cerro del Centinela" or simply: El Centinela (the sentinel) by the Mexicans. The northern slope of the mountain begins at the border between Mexico and the United States, the south side is bordered by Federal Highway 2. It  has an elevation of about 781 meter and is the northernmost peak of the Cocopah mountain range or sierra cucapá.

Mount Signal was used by both native and pioneer explorers of the region, to guide them through the desert. The mountain is on the shield of the town of Mexicali and on the shield and flag of Imperial County, California but each from their own perspective. The song Puro Cachanilla also mentions this mountain.

References

External links
Over 101 images of Mount Signal by artist Allan McCollum, including a topographical map

Mountains of Baja California